Daniel Y. Paye (born 7 October 2000) is a Liberian professional footballer who plays as a center-back for the Liberia national team.

Club career 
From 2019 to 2021, Paye played for FC Bea Mountain. In 2021, he joined Danish club Jammerbugt on a three-year deal. His debut for the club came in a 3–0 league loss to Helsingør on 18 March 2022.

International career 
Paye made his debut for the Liberia national team in a 1–0 friendly loss to Mauritania on 11 June 2021.

References

External links 

 
 

2000 births
Living people
Sportspeople from Monrovia
Liberian footballers
Association football defenders
Jammerbugt FC players
Liberia international footballers
Liberian expatriate footballers
Expatriate men's footballers in Denmark
Liberian expatriate sportspeople in Denmark